The 2022–23 season will be Al-Minaa's first season in the Iraq Division One since the 1989–90 season and their third overall, having been relegated from the Iraqi Premier League in the 2021–22 season. Al-Minaa are participating in the Iraq Division One and the Iraq FA Cup.

Review

Background
After the end of the 2021–22 season, the Football Association did not specify the mechanism for the participation of clubs and their number in the subsequent season, and the matter remained ambiguous. Orally and in the media, the Football Association decided that the system of playing in the league will be according to the professional league system, and any club that did not complete its file according to the Club Licensing Law will not participate. The president of Football Association, Adnan Dirjal promised the president of Al-Minaa club and the governor of Basra that the Al-Minaa team would play in the Iraqi Premier League and not in the Iraq Division One if the club completed the licensing file. Based on the foregoing, the club contracted with coach Basim Qasim and five professionals, paid all their debts and completed the licensing file. But the club was surprised by the decision of the Football Association to reverse its decision to play according to the professional league system and not to accredit the licensed clubs, and that they were deceived by the Football Association.

The club's administrative problems and the unfair decision of the Football Association directly affected the bad start of the Al-Minaa matches, as it exited early from the FA Cup, and it also lost its first match in the Division One by a difference of 3 goals.

Squad

New contracts and transfers

New contracts

Transfers in

Transfers out

Personnel

Technical staff
{| class="toccolours"
!bgcolor=silver|Position
!bgcolor=silver|Name
!bgcolor=silver|Nationality
|- bgcolor=#eeeeee
|Manager:||Basim Qasim||
|- 
|Assistant coach:||Fareed Majeed||
|- bgcolor=#eeeeee
| Goalkeeping coach:||Hashim Khamis||
|-
| Fitness coach:||Nassir Abdul-Amir||
|-bgcolor=#eeeeee
|Team doctor:||Fares Abdullah||
|-
|Team supervisor:||Ali Fadhel||
|-bgcolor=#eeeeee
|Administrator:||Salah Khalil||
|-

Stadium
On December 26, 2022, the Al-Minaa Olympic Stadium was inaugurated by the Ministry of Youth and Sports in preparation for the establishment of the 25th Arabian Gulf Cup, where the tournament will take place on this stadium in addition to the Basra Sports City. The opening included a ceremony in which the retired Al-Minaa stars were honored. After that, a friendly match took place between Al-Minaa and Kuwait, in which Kuwait won 2–1. Ali Hussain (57') and Taha Yassine Khenissi (66') scored the double for Kuwait, and Karrar Mohammed scored for Al-Minaa from a penalty kick in the 89th minute. Despite the completion of the construction of the stadium, the stadium was not handed over to the club to play its matches on it, due to some side deficiencies in it. Therefore, Basra Sports City will remain the temporary stadium for the team this season.

Pre-season and friendlies

Competitions

Overview

Division One

Summary table

Matches

FA Cup

Squad statistics

Goalscorers

Last updated: 2 March 2023

Clean sheets

Last updated: 12 March 2023

External links
 Results of Al-Minaa SC on a FIFA.COM

References 

Al-Mina'a SC seasons